Pata is a locality and former town in the Murray Mallee region of South Australia. It lies on the Loxton railway line and Karoonda Highway between Alawoona and Loxton. The town was surveyed as Muljarra in 1915, and renamed to Pata (an Aboriginal name meaning swamp gum trees) in 1929.

The Congregational Union church opened in 1911.

References

Towns in South Australia